Jang Pill-joon (born April 8, 1988) is a South Korean relief pitcher who plays for the Samsung Lions in the Korea Baseball Organization. He throws right-handed.

Professional career
Jang's early career started with stints in the Hanwha Eagles and Los Angeles Angels organization, as well as in Australia for the Perth Heat. He joined the Samsung Lions in 2015, and was promoted to the closer role in 2017.

International career
He was selected to represent South Korea at the 2017 Asia Professional Baseball Championship, and picked up a save against Chinese Taipei

In 2018, he represented South Korea at the 2018 Asian Games.

References

1988 births
Living people
Arizona League Angels players
Baseball players at the 2018 Asian Games
Asian Games gold medalists for South Korea
Medalists at the 2018 Asian Games
Asian Games medalists in baseball
Cedar Rapids Kernels players
KBO League pitchers
Orem Owlz players
Perth Heat players
Rancho Cucamonga Quakes players
Samsung Lions players
South Korean expatriate baseball players in the United States
South Korean expatriate baseball players in Australia